"Do You Really Want It?" is a song by American rock band Nothing More. It was their second single off of their album The Stories We Tell Ourselves. The song was released as a single on December 19, 2017, and as of April 2018, had peaked at number 6 on the  Billboard Mainstream Rock Songs chart.

Background
The song was first released as a single on December 19, 2017, alongside an accompanying music video. The song's music video features live footage of the band performing the song, filmed through the Tiny Planet app to give the image a fish eye lens effect. This was done to recreate the effect of seeing the band perform live, with the effect wrapping both the band and the crowd into the same frame. The footage was taken from their Denver and Dallas concerts in October and November 2017 respectively.

Themes and composition
Lyrically, the song is centered around the concept that global change cannot occur without personal reflection, with Hawkins repeating the lines of "Everybody wants to change the world/ But no one ever wants to change themselves" and  "We can change it all/ If you really want it" throughout the course of the song. Hawkins explained the meaning behind the song's lyrics:

Personnel
Credits from album inlay booklet.

Band

 Jonny Hawkins – lead vocals
 Mark Vollelunga – guitar, backing vocals
 Daniel Oliver – bass, keyboards, backing vocals
 Ben Anderson – drums

Production
 Will Hoffman - production
 Scott Stevens - additional production and vocal production

Charts

References

2017 songs
Nothing More songs
Eleven Seven Label Group singles